The 2013–14 USHL season is the 35th season of the United States Hockey League as an all-junior league. The regular season ran from September 20, 2013, to April 5, 2014.  The regular season champion Waterloo Black Hawks were awarded the Anderson Cup.  The playoff champion Indiana Ice captured the Clark Cup.

Regular season

Note: GP = Games played; W = Wins; L = Losses; OTL = Overtime losses; PTS = Points; GF = Goals for; GA = Goals against; PIM = Penalties in minutesx = clinched playoff berth; y = clinched conference title; z = clinched regular season title

Eastern Conference

Western Conference

Post Season Awards

All-USHL First Team

All-USHL Second Team

All Rookie Team

Clark Cup Playoffs

Goaltender Jason Pawloski of the Indiana Ice was named Clark Cup Playoffs MVP.

References

External links
 Official website of the United States Hockey League

United States Hockey League seasons
Ushl